Abū Isḥāq Ibrāhīm ibn ʿAlī al-Shīrāzī was a prominent Persian Shafi'i-Ash'ari scholar, debater and the second  teacher،after Ibn Sabbagh al-Shafei (ابن الصباغ), at the Nizamiyya school in Baghdad, which was built in his honour by the vizier (minister) of the Seljuk Empire Nizam al-Mulk.

He acquired the status of a mujtahid in the field of fiqh and usul al-fiqh. The contemporary muhaddithun (hadith specialists) also considered him as their Imam. Likewise, he was respected and enjoyed a high status among the mutakallimun (practitioners of kalam) and Sufis.

He was closely associated with the eminent Sufis of his time like Abu Nasr ibn al-Qushayri (d. 514/1120), the son of al-Qushayri (d. 465/1072).

Abu Bakr al-Shashi said: "Abu Ishaq is Allah's proof on the leading scholars of the time." Al-Muwaffaq al-Hanafi said: "Abu Ishaq is the Amir al-Mu'minin (Prince of the Believers) from among the fuqaha' (jurists)." The Azhari scholar 'Ali Jum'a, an inheritor of al-Bajuri's teachings, calls him the "shaykh of the fuqaha' of his era."

Name 
He is Shaykh al-Islam, Abu Ishaq Ibrahim b. 'Ali b. Yusuf al-Fayruzabadi al-Shirazi.

Birth 
He was born in 393/1003 in Firuzabad in Persia, a town at a distance of about 35 miles from Shiraz.

Teachers 
He studied under various Shafi'i masters in Shiraz and Basra before coming to Baghdad. In Shiraz, he studied under Abu 'Abd Allah al-Baydawi and 'Abd al-Wahhab ibn Ramin. In Basrah, he had al-Kharzi for master. In 415 AH (1024-1025 AD), he entered Baghdad to study under Abu al-Tayyib al-Tabari.

Students 
He had many students, the most famous of whom are: Al-Khatib al-Baghdadi, al-Hariri of Basra, Ibn 'Aqil, Abu al-Walid al-Baji, Fakhr al-Islam Abu Bakr al-Shashi al-Qaffal (d. 507/1113), and Abu al-Qasim ibn al-Samarqandi al-Dimashqi (d. 536/1142).

Works 
He authored many works, among the most famous of them are:
 Al-Tanbih fi al-Fiqh al-Shafi'i, one of the five most important books in Shafi'i jurisprudence, played a prominent role in the development of the Shafi'i school. Al-Nawawi wrote a commentary on it called Tashih al-Tanbih, as well as two other commentaries by Ibn al-Rif'a (d. 710/1310) and al-Zarkashi (d. 794/1392).
 , a comprehensive manual of Islamic law according to the Shafi'i school, which took him fourteen years to produce, and which was later on explained by the Shafi'i hadith scholar al-Nawawi naming it al-Majmū' Sharh al-Muhadhdhab, was a recension and compilation of all the strands of Shafi'i jurisprudence.

These two works are counted among the five key reference texts for the Shafi'i school, and the Muhadhdhab was considered by al-Nawawi to be one of the two most important works of this school ever produced.

, one of the earliest works in relation to Usul al-Fiqh specifically in the Shafi'i school of jurisprudence. This work was contemporaneous to major developments in post-Shafi'i usul, such as the writings of al-Juwayni, with whom he apparently differed on a number of points.
, a summary of Ash'ari creed with kalam proofs.
, gives the lives of the jurists among the Sahaba (companions of the Prophet), and the Tabi'in (followers of the companions of the Prophet) and those of the founders of schools and their disciples.
, a book in 'ilm al-khilāf (the science of juridical disagreement).
 Al-Ma'una fi al-Jadal.

Death 
He died in Baghdad in 476 AH (1083–1084 AD), and the 'Abbasid caliph al-Muqtadi (d. 487/1094) attended his funeral. On his death, his pupils sat in solemn mourning in the Nizāmiya college, and after that ceremony, Muwyyad al-Mulk, son of Nizam al-Mulk, appointed Abu Sa'd al-Mutwalli to the vacant place, but when Nizām al-Mulk heard of it, he wrote to disapprove of that nomination, adding that the college should be shut up during a year, on account of Abu Ishaq's death; he then blamed the person who had undertaken to fill his place, and ordered the sheikh Abu Nasr ibn al-Sabbagh to profess in his stead.

See also 
 Al-Juwayni
 Al-Ghazali
 List of Ash'aris and Maturidis
 List of Muslim theologians

Notes

References

External links 
 Abu Ishaq al-Shirazi: No need to discuss the reliability of Imams like Abu Hanifa

Asharis
Shafi'i fiqh scholars
11th-century Muslim theologians
Muslim ascetics
Shaykh al-Islāms
Sunni imams
Muslim scholars persecuted by Hanbalis
Persian Sunni Muslim scholars of Islam
People from Firuzabad, Fars
1003 births
1083 deaths